Cannabis in Chad is illegal.

Cultivation
Per a 1999 report, the islands of Lake Chad contain a number of hectares of cannabis but local police have not destroyed them.

References

Chad
Drugs in Chad